Block, Inc. (formerly Square, Inc.) is an American multinational technology conglomerate founded in 2009 by Jack Dorsey and Jim McKelvey and launched its first platform in 2010. It has been traded as a public company on the New York Stock Exchange since November 2015 with the ticker symbol SQ.

From its founding to December 10, 2021, the company was named Square, Inc. The company's namesake product for small businesses is still titled "Square".  Square is a payments platform aimed at small and medium businesses that allows them to accept credit card payments and use smartphone or tablet computers as payment registers for a point-of-sale system. Block has a number of other businesses. Cash App is a mobile app that allows monetary transfers both among users and between users and businesses. Afterpay is a buy-now-pay-later service. Weebly is a web hosting service. Tidal is a subscription-based music, podcast and video streaming service that offers audio and music videos.

History
The original inspiration for Square occurred to Jack Dorsey in 2009 when Jim McKelvey (a friend of Dorsey) was unable to complete a $2,000 sale of his glass faucets and fittings because he could not accept credit cards. Co-founders Dorsey—who also co-founded Twitter—and McKelvey began developing the company out of a small office in St. Louis. The name "Square" derives from the company's square-shaped card readers.

In October 2020, Square put approximately 1% of their total assets ($50 million) in Bitcoin (4,709 bitcoins), citing Bitcoin's "potential to be a more ubiquitous currency in the future" as their main reasoning. The company purchased approximately 3,318 bitcoins in February 2021 for a cost of around $170 million, bringing Square's total holdings to around 8,027 bitcoins (equivalent to around $500 million USD in 2021, around $190 million USD as of February 2023).

On March 2, 2021, Square reached an agreement to acquire majority ownership in Tidal. Square will pay $297 million in cash and stock for Tidal, with Jay-Z joining the company's board of directors. Jay-Z, as well as other artists who currently own stock in Tidal, will remain stakeholders.

On December 1, 2021, Square announced that it would change its company name to Block, Inc. on December 10. The change was announced shortly after Dorsey resigned as CEO of Twitter. On December 10, 2021, the name change took effect, and Square, Inc. became Block. However, on December 16, less than a week into the rebrand, H&R Block, sued the company for trademark infringement, claiming that the name seeks to confuse customers by misappropriating the Block brand name, which H&R owns.

On January 31, 2022, Block completed its acquisition of Afterpay.

Subsidiaries, products, services

Square

Square is a payments platform aimed at small and medium businesses that allows them to accept credit card payments and use tablet computers as payment registers for a point-of-sale system. The platform was founded in 2009 by Twitter Co-Founder Jack Dorsey and fellow entrepreneur Jim McKelvey. Their goal was to create a POS technology that would group together merchant services and mobile payments into one, simple, smooth, and modern service. Currently, businesses in 8 countries can use Square’s Technology, and their POS systems can accept 130 internationally accepted currencies.

Cash App

 
Launched in October 2013, Cash App (formerly Square Cash) allows person-to-person money transfer via the app or website. Cash App reported 36 million monthly active Cash App customers as of December 2020.

In March 2015, the firm introduced Square Cash for businesses, which includes the ability for individuals, organizations, and business owners to use a unique username, known as a $cashtag, to send and receive money. In January 2018, the app expanded to allow users to buy and sell bitcoin. Additionally they began offering stock trading. The company issues a debit card to be used with the account. Cash App is currently testing new features to allow users to borrow up to $200.

Afterpay

Afterpay is an Australian digital payment platform in which a bought product can be paid off in four installments. This idea made in 2008 by a then eighteen-year-old Nick Molnar was geared towards millennials and inspired by the aftermath of the 2008 Global Financial Crisis. Molnar and Partner/ Co-founder Anthony Eisen launched their platform in 2014 and in four years their product reached a market capitalization of around $3.3 billion dollars. In February 2020, Afterpay was reported to have 3.6 million active customers in the US, 3.1 million in Australia and New Zealand, and 600,000 in the UK. In August 2021, Afterpay and Square announced that Afterpay would be acquired by Square. Block paid US$29 billion in stock for the acquisition and the process was finalized in January 2022. Although Afterpay is now owned by Block inc., Molnar and Eisen still spearhead Afterpay’s merchant and consumer businesses.

Weebly

Weebly is a web hosting service. Weebly was founded in 2006 by David Rusenko, Dan Veltri, and Chris Fanini after they all met as students at Pennsylvania State University. In 2007, Weebly raised $650,000 in initial capital from a group of angel investors. In 2018, Square Inc. (Now Block Inc.) bought Weebly in exchange for $365 million in cash and stock. The company slowly grew and updated its capabilities over the course of a decade and now Weebly is a free online website creator that operates out of the web browser. The site offers users access to drag and drop features to build their websites, with unlimited storage options and custom URLs.

Tidal

Tidal is a digital music streaming service that gives users access to over 80 million songs from genres and artists across the world. Tidal was founded on the basis of artists getting paid rightfully for their work, meaning fully and directly instead of through traditional means. Tidal was first launched in 2014 by a Norwegian company called Aspiro. Aspiro was purchased by Jay-Z in 2015 for $56 million. In early 2017, the Sprint Corporation purchased 33% of the company for $200 million and then in 2021 Square Inc. paid $297 million for a majority ownership of the company. Tidal now operates in 61 countries worldwide. In June, 2022, through the disclosure of the Annual Stockholder Meeting 2022, Block reported that the stake acquired in the Tidal music service was 86.8%.

Financials
Square received angel investments from Marissa Mayer, Kevin Rose, Biz Stone, Dennis Crowley, Shawn Fanning, MC Hammer, and Esther Dyson. Since then, it has raised several additional rounds of funding:
 Series A funding from Khosla Ventures
 Series B funding from Sequoia Capital
 Series C funding from Kleiner Perkins
 Series D funding from Citi Ventures, Rizvi Traverse Management, and Starbucks
 Series E funding from Goldman Sachs, Rizvi Traverse Management, and GIC Private Limited

The company's valuation in October 2014 was $6 billion. On November 19, 2015, Square had its IPO on the New York Stock Exchange with an initial valuation of $2.9 billion, down by more than half from its last valuation in October 2014 at $6 billion. The series E funding shares had different rights than the common shares sold at the IPO, therefore the $6 billion 'valuation' from October 2014 is wrong.  Although the firm was yet to make a profit as of 2015 and had lost $420 million since 2012, it had decreased its losses from 44% of revenues to 16% in the six months leading up to its IPO. For the fiscal year 2018, Square reported losses of US$38 million, with an annual revenue of US$3.299 billion, an increase of 49.0% over the previous fiscal cycle.

Business

Operations
Block was co-founded by Twitter creator Jack Dorsey under the name Square. Dorsey also serves as chief executive officer and Amrita Ahuja serves as chief financial officer. Block's office is in San Francisco. The firm has more than 5,000 employees.

Block's payment platform, Square, has been available in the United States since 2010 and the company launched in Canada at the end of 2012. In March 2020, Square implemented remote work due to the COVID-19 pandemic. In May 2020, Square announced that some of its workers would be allowed to be permanent remote workers. As of 2021, although Block's real estate footprint remains intact, they no longer have a designated headquarters location.

Financing and acquisitions
In August 2014, Victory Park Capital, an asset management firm, invested in Square Capital. In May 2015, Square Capital raised additional funding, with Victory Park Capital tripling its initial investment. As of 2016, Square had loaned $1 billion to companies through Square Capital since the program's inception. On November 19, 2015, Square Inc. became a public company via an initial public offering. On April 19, 2018, Square announced that it had acquired Zesty, a food delivery service that caters to corporate offices. On April 26, 2018, Square announced that it would acquire Weebly, a website-building service, for $365 million. In May 2019, Square announced that it had acquired Eloquent Labs, an artificial intelligence startup helping improve the customer service experience.

In February 2020, Square announced that it had acquired Dessa, a Toronto-based deep learning company. In November 2020, Square announced it was acquiring Credit Karma Tax, a free do-it-yourself tax-filing service, from Credit Karma for $50 million and would make it a part of its Cash App unit. In March 2021, Square announced it was acquiring a significant majority in music streaming platform Tidal for $293 million in a deal of stock and cash. In the same month, Square's Q1 sales surged 266% as transactions jumped amid economic recovery. In August 2021, Square announced its acquisition of Afterpay, a company offering a "buy now, pay later" service. Square finalized the $29 billion stock deal on January 31, 2022.

See also
 PayPal

References

External links

 
2009 establishments in Missouri
2015 initial public offerings
American companies established in 2009
Companies based in San Francisco
Companies listed on the New York Stock Exchange
Financial services companies established in 2009
Financial services companies based in California
Online financial services companies of the United States
Point of sale companies
Technology companies based in the San Francisco Bay Area
South of Market, San Francisco